The 434th Flying Training Squadron  is part of the 47th Flying Training Wing based at Laughlin Air Force Base, Texas.  It operates Beechcraft T-6 Texan II aircraft conducting flight training.

History

World War II

The squadron was activated on 15 October 1943 at Grand Central Air Terminal. It was initially equipped with the Lockheed P-38F Lightning and trained for combat to serve as an air defense organization for the west coast as part of IV Fighter Command.

Even though the defense of the US west coast initially took priority, it was decided to deploy Lightning squadrons to Britain for heavy bomber escort duty. The squadron was assigned to VIII Fighter Command, Eighth Air Force and moved to RAF Wattisham, England, in April–May 1944.

From England, the squadron escorted heavy bombers during operations against targets on the Continent, strafed targets of opportunity, and flew fighter-bomber, counter-air, and area-patrol missions. Engaged primarily in Boeing B-17 Flying Fortress and Consolidated B-24 Liberator escort activities and fighter sweeps until the Normandy invasion in June 1944.

Patrolled the beachhead during the invasion. Strafed and dive-bombed troops, bridges, locomotives, railway cars, barges, vehicles, airfields, gun emplacements, flak towers, ammunition dumps, power stations, and radar sites while on escort or fighter-bomber missions as the Allies drove across France during the summer and fall of 1944. The unit flew area patrols to support the breakthrough at Saint-Lô in July and the airborne attack on the Netherlands in September.   The unit continued escort and fighter-bomber activities from October to mid-December 1944. It converted to P-51s between 10 September and 1 October, using both types on missions until conversion was completed.

Participated in the Battle of the Bulge (December 1944 – January 1945) by escorting bombers to and from targets in the battle area and by strafing transportation targets while on escort duty. From February to April 1945 it continued to fly escort missions, but also provided area patrols to support the airborne attack across the Rhine in March.  Returned to Camp Kilmer New Jersey in November 1945, and was inactivated in December 1945.

Cold War 

The squadron trained as fighter-day, and later, tactical fighter squadron from, 1952–1962.  It was not manned from, 3 January 1962 – October 1966.  In 1966, began training McDonnelll F-4 Phantom II crews for assignment in Southeast Asia.  In August 1972, the squadron deployed to Thailand, where it served under operational control of 49th Tactical Fighter Wing.  It engaged in combat over North and South Vietnam.  It redeployed to the U.S. in October 1972.  By 1975, the 434th provided combat aircrew training for U.S. and Allied pilots.  From 1977 to 1991, the squadron trained pilots, weapon systems officers, and forward air controllers.

Lineage
 Constituted as the 434th Fighter Squadron on 12 October 1943
 Activated on 15 October 1943
 Inactivated on 1 December 1945
 Redesignated 434th Fighter-Bomber Squadron on 15 October 1952
 Activated on 1 December 1952
 Redesignated 434th Fighter-Day Squadron on 15 February 1954
 Redesignated 434th Tactical Fighter Squadron on 1 July 1958
 Redesignated 434th Tactical Fighter Training Squadron on 1 October 1975
 Inactivated on 3 May 1991
 Redesignated 434th Fighter Training Squadron on 21 June 2007
 Activated on 19 July 2007
 Redesignated 434th Flying Training Squadron on unknown date

Assignments
 479th Fighter Group, 15 October 1943 – 1 December 1945
 479th Fighter-Bomber Group (later 479th Fighter-Day Group), 1 December 1952
 479th Fighter-Day Wing (later 479th Tactical Fighter Wing), 8 October 1957
 35th Tactical Fighter Wing, 1 October 1971 (attached to 49th Tactical Fighter Wing, 12 August–6 October 1972)
 479th Tactical Training Wing, 1 January 1977 – 3 May 1991
 47th Operations Group, 19 July 2007 – present

Stations

 Grand Central Air Terminal, California, 15 October 1943
 Lomita Flight Strip, California, 6 February 1944
 Santa Maria Army Air Field, California, 8–18 April 1944
 RAF Wattisham (AAF-377), England, 15 May 1944 – c. 23 November 1945
 Camp Kilmer, New Jersey, 29 November–1 December 1945

 George Air Force Base, California, 1 December 1952
 Deployed to Moron Air Base, Spain, 9 August–17 December 1961
 Deployed to Ching Chuan Kang Air Base, Taiwan, April 1965 – February 1966
 Deployed to Takhli Royal Thai Air Force Base, Thailand, 12 August–6 October 1972
 Holloman Air Force Base, New Mexico, 1 January 1977 – 3 May 1991
 Laughlin Air Force Base, Texas, 19 July 2007 – present

Aircraft

 Lockheed P-38 Lightning (1943–1944)
 North American F-51 Mustang (1944–1945, 1952–1953)
 Republic P-47 Thunderbolt (1945)
 North American F-86 Sabre (1953–1955)
 North American F-100 Super Sabre (1954–1959)
 Lockheed F-104 Starfighter (1959–1962)
 McDonnell F-4 Phantom II (1966–1976)
 Northrop T-38 Talon (1977–1991, 2007–2012)
 Beechcraft T-6 Texan II (2012 – present)

References

 Notes

 Citations

Bibliography

 
 
 
 
 

Military units and formations in Texas
0434
Fighter squadrons of the United States Air Force